Cities and towns of oblast significance:
Bryansk (Брянск) (administrative center)
city districts:
Bezhitsky (Бежицкий)
Urban-type settlements under the city district's jurisdiction:
Raditsa-Krylovka (Радица-Крыловка)
Fokinsky (Фокинский)
Urban-type settlements under the city district's jurisdiction:
Belye Berega (Белые Берега)
Sovetsky (Советский)
Volodarsky (Володарский)
Urban-type settlements under the city district's jurisdiction:
Bolshoye Polpino (Большое Полпино)
Fokino (Фокино)
Klintsy (Клинцы)
Novozybkov (Новозыбков)
Seltso (Сельцо)
Districts:
Brasovsky (Брасовский)
Urban-type settlements under the district's jurisdiction:
Lokot (Локоть)
with 13 selsovets under the district's jurisdiction.
Bryansky (Брянский)
with 15 selsovets under the district's jurisdiction.
Dubrovsky (Дубровский)
Urban-type settlements under the district's jurisdiction:
Dubrovka (Дубровка)
with 10 selsovets under the district's jurisdiction.
Dyatkovsky (Дятьковский)
Towns under the district's jurisdiction:
Dyatkovo (Дятьково)
Urban-type settlements under the district's jurisdiction:
Bytosh (Бытошь)
Ivot (Ивот)
Lyubokhna (Любохна)
Star (Старь)
with 8 selsovets under the district's jurisdiction.
Gordeyevsky (Гордеевский)
with 14 selsovets under the district's jurisdiction.
Karachevsky (Карачевский)
Towns under the district's jurisdiction:
Karachev (Карачев)
with 13 selsovets under the district's jurisdiction.
Kletnyansky (Клетнянский)
Urban-type settlements under the district's jurisdiction:
Kletnya (Клетня)
with 16 selsovets under the district's jurisdiction.
Klimovsky (Климовский)
Urban-type settlements under the district's jurisdiction:
Klimovo (Климово)
with 23 selsovets under the district's jurisdiction.
Klintsovsky (Клинцовский)
with 20 selsovets under the district's jurisdiction.
Komarichsky (Комаричский)
Urban-type settlements under the district's jurisdiction:
Komarichi (Комаричи)
with 17 selsovets under the district's jurisdiction.
Krasnogorsky (Красногорский)
Urban-type settlements under the district's jurisdiction:
Krasnaya Gora (Красная Гора)
with 17 selsovets under the district's jurisdiction.
Mglinsky (Мглинский)
Towns under the district's jurisdiction:
Mglin (Мглин)
with 21 selsovets under the district's jurisdiction.
Navlinsky (Навлинский)
Urban-type settlements under the district's jurisdiction:
Altukhovo (Алтухово)
Navlya (Навля)
with 18 selsovets under the district's jurisdiction.
Novozybkovsky (Новозыбковский)
with 17 selsovets under the district's jurisdiction.
Pochepsky (Почепский)
Towns under the district's jurisdiction:
Pochep (Почеп)
Urban-type settlements under the district's jurisdiction:
Ramasukha (Рамасуха)
with 26 selsovets under the district's jurisdiction.
Pogarsky (Погарский)
Urban-type settlements under the district's jurisdiction:
Pogar (Погар)
with 20 selsovets under the district's jurisdiction.
Rognedinsky (Рогнединский)
Urban-type settlements under the district's jurisdiction:
Rognedino (Рогнедино)
with 10 selsovets under the district's jurisdiction.
Sevsky (Севский)
Towns under the district's jurisdiction:
Sevsk (Севск)
with 16 selsovets under the district's jurisdiction.
Starodubsky (Стародубский)
Towns under the district's jurisdiction:
Starodub (Стародуб)
with 21 selsovets under the district's jurisdiction.
Surazhsky (Суражский)
Towns under the district's jurisdiction:
Surazh (Сураж)
with 15 selsovets under the district's jurisdiction.
Suzemsky (Суземский)
Urban-type settlements under the district's jurisdiction:
Kokorevka (Кокоревка)
Suzemka (Суземка)
with 11 selsovets under the district's jurisdiction.
Trubchevsky (Трубчевский)
Towns under the district's jurisdiction:
Trubchevsk (Трубчевск)
Urban-type settlements under the district's jurisdiction:
Belaya Beryozka (Белая Берёзка)
with 17 selsovets under the district's jurisdiction.
Unechsky (Унечский)
Towns under the district's jurisdiction:
Unecha (Унеча)
with 18 selsovets under the district's jurisdiction.
Vygonichsky (Выгоничский)
Urban-type settlements under the district's jurisdiction:
Vygonichi (Выгоничи)
with 14 selsovets under the district's jurisdiction.
Zhiryatinsky (Жирятинский)
with 10 selsovets under the district's jurisdiction.
Zhukovsky (Жуковский)
Towns under the district's jurisdiction:
Zhukovka (Жуковка)
with 12 selsovets under the district's jurisdiction.
Zlynkovsky (Злынковский)
Towns under the district's jurisdiction:
Zlynka (Злынка)
Urban-type settlements under the district's jurisdiction:
Vyshkov (Вышков)
with 9 selsovets under the district's jurisdiction.

References

Bryansk Oblast
Bryansk Oblast